Muhammad ibn Yūsuf al-Warrāq (* 904 in Guadalajara; † 973 or 974 in Córdoba) (in present-day Spain) was an Andalusían historian and geographer.

Life
He spent many years in Kairouan and returned to Cordoba during the reign of Caliph al-Hakam II.

Works
Al-Warrāq wrote for al-Hakam II a series of historical and geographical works on North Africa, none of which have survived whole, although many fragments of his extensive production are preserved in al-Bakri's Book of Roads and Kingdoms from one century later. From the extracts transcribed in al-Bakri's work relying on al-Warrāq, one can conclude that the latter was the first to mix geography and history. Any geographical subject is accompanied by its historical context and a detailed description. Ibn Hazm mentioned that his roots lay in the Berber tribal confederation of the Zenata.

Notes

904 births
970s deaths
Year of death uncertain
People from Guadalajara, Spain
Geographers from Al-Andalus
Arab geographers
10th-century Arabic writers

10th-century historians from al-Andalus
10th-century geographers